Kashkino (Qaşqa) is a rural locality (a selo) and the administrative center of Kashkinsky Selsoviet, Askinsky District, Bashkortostan, Russia. The population was 843 as of 2010. There are 12 streets.

Geography 
Kashkino is located 37 km southeast of Askino (the district's administrative centre) by road. Novy Suyush is the nearest rural locality.

References 

Rural localities in Askinsky District